Askariyeh (also Romanized as ‘Askarīyeh) is a village in Fahraj Rural District, in the Central District of Yazd County, Yazd Province, Iran. At the 2006 census, its population was 542, in 133 families.

References 

Populated places in Yazd County